Q38 may refer to:
 Q38 (New York City bus)
 
 London Underground Q38 Stock
 Ṣād (surah), of the Quran